Courtney is a name of Norman-French origin, which became an English surname.

Courtney may also refer to:

Places

In the United States
 Courtney, Missouri, an unincorporated community 
 Courtney, North Carolina, an unincorporated community in Yadkin County
 Courtney, Pennsylvania, a neighborhood of the borough of New Eagle
 Courtney Peak (Washington)

Elsewhere
 Courtney Peak (Antarctica), Ellsworth Land, Antarctica
 Courtney (crater), a tiny lunar impact crater
 Camp Courtney, a United States Marine Base in Gushikawa, Okinawa, Japan

Other
 , several United States Navy ships
 Courtney Buses, a bus operating company based in Bracknell, Berkshire, England

See also
 Courtenay (disambiguation)